Bobby Walker was a Scottish association football wing forward who played in both Scotland and the United States.

In 1927, Walker briefly played for East Stirlingshire F.C.  In the autumn of 1927, he signed with the New York Nationals of the American Soccer League.  In April 1928, Walker and his teammates won the 1928 National Challenge Cup by defeating Bricklayers and Masons F.C., 4-1 on aggregate.  Walker began the 1928-1929 season with the Nationals, but moved to J&P Coats thirteen games into the season.  He played for Coats into the 1929 fall season when the team was known as the Pawtucket Rangers.

References

External links
 

1906 births
American Soccer League (1921–1933) players
Kilmarnock F.C. players
East Stirlingshire F.C. players
J&P Coats players
New York Nationals (ASL) players
Pawtucket Rangers players
Scottish footballers
Scottish expatriate footballers
Year of death missing
Association football forwards
British expatriate sportspeople in the United States
Expatriate soccer players in the United States